Arsenic chloride may refer to either of the following:

Arsenic trichloride, AsCl3
Arsenic pentachloride, AsCl5